Meniolagomeka (also Meniolágoméka) was a Moravian Church settlement of German missionaries and Lenape converts on the Aquashicola Creek near Kunkletown and Smith's Gap in Monroe County, Pennsylvania. Moravian workers included Brothers Bernhard Adam Grubè/Grube, John Joseph Bull (Schebosh), Nathanael Seidel, Georg Jungmann, Johann Peter Yarrel, Georg Jungmann, Abraham Bünninger, Johann Jacob Schmick, and Sisters Anna Margarethe Jungmann (née Bechtel, widowed Büttner) and Anna Nitschmann. It was organized formally in 1742 on directions from Count Nicholas von Zinzendorf and had approximately 50-60 Indian and missionary residents. Lenape residents included Teedyuskung, Wiwumkamek, Telepuwechque, Kullis, Achkowema, Uchqueschis, Machschapochque, and Mamsochalend.

The Moravians were evicted from Meniolagomeka as an after-effect of the Walking Purchase and resettled at Gnadenhütten by 1754.

A stone monument was dedicated by the Moravian Historical Society on October 22, 1901.

References
Joseph Maximilian Hark, Meniolagomeka: Annals of a Moravian Indian Village an Hundred and Thirty Years Ago (1880)
Dedication of the Monument at Meniolagomeka, October 22, 1901 (Transactions of the Moravian Historical Society, 1902)

External links
Finding aid of the records of the Records of the Moravian Missions to the American Indians Moravian Archives, Bethlehem
Lenape Nation of Pennsylvania

Populated places established in 1742
Monroe County, Pennsylvania
1742 establishments in Pennsylvania
Moravian settlement in Pennsylvania

Lenape
Native American history of Pennsylvania